Sibirocosa is a genus of wolf spiders containing seven species, all from Russia, mostly found from northeastern Siberia south to Primorsky Krai.  Spiders of this genus are dark coloured and hairy with a body length of 5.25 - 7.25 mm.

Species
 Sibirocosa kolymensis Marusik, Azarkina & Koponen, 2004 — Russia
 Sibirocosa koponeni Omelko & Marusik, 2013 — Russia
 Sibirocosa manchurica Marusik, Azarkina & Koponen, 2004 — Russia
 Sibirocosa nadolnyi Omelko & Marusik, 2013 — Russia
 Sibirocosa sibirica (Kulczynski, 1908) — Russia
 Sibirocosa subsolana (Kulczynski, 1907) — Russia
 Sibirocosa trilikauskasi Omelko & Marusik, 2013 — Russia

References
Sibirocosa at Encyclopedia of Life

Specific

Lycosidae
Araneomorphae genera
Spiders of Russia